Giovanni Cendramini (1760 – 8 February 1839) was an Italian painter and engraver.

He was born in Roncade, Province of Treviso. At the age of 19 years, he came to London and apprenticed with Francesco Bartolozzi, an engraver from Florence, then in England. Cendramini married an English wife and in 1805 was invited to Russia and patronized by the emperor.

Initially forbidden to leave Russia, he escaped with the help of the Neapolitan ambassador at St. Petersburg. On returning to England, he painted a Vision of St Catherine. He is best known for engravings of paintings of old masters such as Paolo Veronese, Leonardo da Vinci, Sebastiano del Piombo, and Giuseppe Ribera. He died in London.

References

1760 births
1839 deaths
People from Roncade
18th-century Italian painters
Italian male painters
19th-century Italian painters
Italian engravers
Italian Baroque painters
19th-century Italian male artists
18th-century Italian male artists